Nerverek is an Indian progressive metal band formed in Chennai, India. The band won Campus Rock Idols '07, becoming the first South Indian band to win the national inter-college contest. They performed recently as the opening act for international act, the Scorpions in Bangalore and also opened for Iron Maiden in their tour to India at Mumbai on 1 February 2008. In January 2011, they opened for Pain of Salvation along with Bicycle Days at Saarang 2011, the annual cultural festival of IIT Madras. 

They are planning to release their first record, Forever Endeavour, in March–April 2008.

Band members
Arjun 'Chiq' Dhanraj: Vocals, guitar
Ishaan Krishna: Bass, backing vocals
Ritesh John Dharmaraj: Drums
Ananth Kumar: Keyboards, backing vocals

See also
Indian rock
Kryptos (band)
Bhayanak Maut
Nicotine (band)
Inner Sanctum (band)
Scribe (band)
Demonic Resurrection

References

Progressive metal musical groups
Indian heavy metal musical groups
Musical groups established in 2003
Musical quartets